Tequila Volcano, or Volcán de Tequila is a stratovolcano located near Tequila, Jalisco, in Mexico. It stands at a height of 2,920 meters (9,580 feet) above sea level,. Stratovolcanoes, also referred to as composite volcanoes, are the "iconically" conical-shaped volcanoes, found most commonly along subduction zones. Stratovolcanoes are composed of steeply dipping layers of lava, hardened ash, and other material that erupted from the main vent such as tephra and pumice. Commonly higher than 2500 meters above sea-level, Stratovolcanoes have gentle lower slopes which gradually become steeper the higher you get with a relatively small summit crater. Due to their eruptions, Stratovolcanoes have several distinct variations giving some a specific feature such as calderas and amphitheaters.

In recorded history, volcanoes in subduction zones are known to have the most explosive eruptions causing the most danger to the surrounding civilization. These eruptions will generally produce pyroclastic flows containing toxic gas and hot volcanic fragment traveling at high speeds. Stratovolcanoes can erupt any kind of magma type although the lava usually cools and hardens not letting it get very far.

Tectonic setting
Tequila Volcano is located near the town of Tequila in the state of Jalisco, Mexico and it is the fourth highest of the state after Volcán Nevado de Colima, Volcán de Fuego and Cerro Viejo. The Tequila Volcano is part of a chain of volcanoes parallel with the Middle America Trench, is a  oceanic trench in the eastern Pacific Ocean off the southwestern coast of Middle America, stretching from central Mexico and Costa Rica. At least four different magmatic series has been discovered around Tequila volcano: the Santa Rosa intraplate basalts; a group of vitreous domes and flows of dacitic to rhyolitic compositions, pyroxene andesites and dacites with strong subduction signatures; and amphibole bearing andesites that erupted through the flanks of the main cone.

Geological history
Compared to other types of volcanoes, the Tequila Volcano lived much longer and was more active since it is a stratovolcano. There is no particular date of when exactly the volcano itself was active, but we can tell whether it was active or not according to its volcanic field and structure. The Tequila Volcano’s volcanic field is 1600 km^3, showing that it was active at one point in time, it is, however; no longer active. Although the volcano is now dormant, if it were to erupt, the explosion would be extremely violent. Just like Mount Fuji and St. Helens, stratovolcanoes tend to be very big because they have a conduit system inside them that channels magma from deep within the Earth to the surface. These type of volcanoes also have clusters of vents, with lava breaking through walls, or issuing from fissures on the sides of the mountain which allows them to grow big & very tall. Stratovolcanoes make up some of the world’s most memorable mountains as well as most violent eruptions, for example, on May 18, 1980, Mount St. Helens erupted. The eruption covered approximately 230 square miles of a forest that was destroyed and the ash that was in the atmosphere drifted over 11 states with a total number of 57 casualties, however; when the Tequila Volcano erupted, there were no casualties.

Tequila Volcano today
The volcano does not pose a threat to surrounding communities. Being inactive for around 220,000 years it is now covered in vegetation and is easy to access. Visitors can drive to the volcano's crater without any concerns for safety.

The volcano has contributed greatly towards an agave culture where Mexico relies on the rich soils that the volcano created to cultivate blue agave and create the beverage Tequila and Mescal. Tequila, Jalisco benefits greatly from the Tequila Volcano. When the volcano erupted, lava flowed where the town is located today and left enriched soils where blue agave can thrive. Blue agave is the main ingredient for Mexico’s National drink, tequila. Agave is the dominant agriculture in Tequila, Jalisco; "roughly one-fourth of all inhabitants of Tequila work in the fields and at least another 1,200 work distilling, bottling, packaging, or promoting tequila."

See also
List of Ultras of Mexico
Mountain peaks of México

References

External links
"Volcán de Tequila" on Summitpost.com

Landforms of Jalisco
Stratovolcanoes of Mexico
Pleistocene stratovolcanoes
Volcanoes of Jalisco